The Hungarian National Philharmonic Orchestra (formerly, the Hungarian State Symphony Orchestra) is one of the most prestigious symphony orchestras in Hungary.  Based in the capital city of Budapest, it has stood as one of the pillars of the country's musical life since its founding in 1923 as the Metropolitan Orchestra.  Zsolt Hamar is the current musical director.

Principal conductors
Zsolt Hamar (2017–present)
Zoltán Kocsis (1997–2016)
Ken-Ichiro Kobayashi (1987–1997)
János Ferencsik (1952–1984)
László Somogyi and Ferenc Fricsay (1945–1952)
Béla Csilléry (1939–1945)
Dezső Bor (1923–1939)

References

External links
Official website

Musical groups established in 1923
Hungarian orchestras
1923 establishments in Hungary